Gavin Patrik Collins (born July 17, 1995) is an American professional baseball catcher in the Tampa Bay Rays organization. He was drafted by the Cleveland Indians in the 13th round of the 2016 Major League Baseball draft.

Amateur career
Collins attended El Toro High School in Lake Forest, California, and played college baseball at Mississippi State University. As a junior at Mississippi State in 2016, he hit .302 with ten home runs and 39 runs batted in (RBIs) over sixty games, splitting time in the field between catcher and third base. After the season, he was selected by the Cleveland Indians in the 13th round of the 2016 Major League Baseball draft.

Professional career

Cleveland Indians/Guardians
Collins signed with the Indians and made his professional debut with the Mahoning Valley Scrappers with whom he hit .260 over 48 games. In 2017, he split time between the Lake County Captains and Lynchburg Hillcats, slashing a combined .272/.340/.481 with 12 home runs and 54 RBIs over eighty games. In 2018, he returned to Lynchburg and hit .232 over 62 games. For the third straight year, in 2019, he spent the season with Lynchburg, batting .262 with seven home runs and 61 RBIs over 100 games. He did not play a minor league game in 2020 due to the cancellation of the season caused by the COVID-19 pandemic. 

He spent the 2021 season with the Columbus Clippers, batting .182 with five home runs and 22 RBIs over fifty games. He returned to Columbus to begin the 2022 season. In 41 games for the Clippers, Collins slashed .235/.326/.370 with 4 home runs and 16 RBI. Collins elected minor league free agency on November 10, 2022.

Tampa Bay Rays
On January 25, 2023, Collins signed a minor league contract with the Tampa Bay Rays organization.

References

External links

Living people
1995 births
American baseball players
Baseball catchers
Mississippi State University alumni